Thacholi Marumakan Chandu is a 1974 Indian Malayalam-language film, directed and produced by P. Bhaskaran. The film stars Prem Nazir, Sukumari, Jayabharathi and Srividya. The film had musical score by V. Dakshinamoorthy.

Cast
Prem Nazir as Thacholi Othenan Kurup, Chandu (double role)
Sukumari as Kunki
Jayabharathi as Thazhathumadom Maathu
Srividya as Kanni
Adoor Bhasi as Kandacheri Chappan
Thikkurissy Sukumaran Nair
Sreelatha Namboothiri as Kuttimani
T. R. Omana as Maakkam
Bahadoor as Pokkan
K. P. Ummer as Kandarar Menon
Meena as Eppennu
Balan K Nair as Yenali
Kaviyoor Ponnamma as Unnichirutha
Philomina as Nanga
Sankaradi as Thazhathumadom Kannoth Moothavar
T. S. Muthaiah as Guru
S. P. Pilla as Vaittil Thampan
Muthukulam Ragavan Pilla as Kanachira Kannappan
N. Govindankutty as Kunjikelu
Santo Krishnan

Soundtrack
The music was composed by V. Dakshinamoorthy and the lyrics were written by P. Bhaskaran.

References

External links
 

1974 films
1970s Malayalam-language films
Films directed by P. Bhaskaran